Telford College is a further education college in Telford, Shropshire, England. It operates from one main site and many in-company training  sites and community-based courses spread out across Shropshire and the whole of the United Kingdom. During 2017 the college improved its Ofsted rating to Grade 3.

History
The college was founded in 1892 by Charles Walker as the Centre for Art and Science Classes and was originally based in Oakengates, Shropshire. From 1913 until the Second World War it was based in the former Coffee House and Recreation Centre in Market Street which was since demolished by the Telford Development Corporation. The college moved to a new site, built in 1926, down Hartsbridge Road becoming the Walker Technical College. In the 1960s it opened a larger campus on Haybridge Road in Wellington which became the part of new town of Telford. On 1 January 1983 the college was renamed Telford College of Arts and Technology  commonly abbreviated as TCAT (pronounced  ). The Bridge Centre (literacy and numeracy department) opened in 1990 followed by a new Learning Resource Centre and the Haybridge Restaurant in 1997.

On 12 November 2004 W Block (Charles Walker Building) Centre of Vocational Excellence was officially opened by Mr Michael Beasley CBE.

On 31 October 2005 E Block and S Block (sports and hairdressing) were officially opened by the Princess Royal.

In 2006 it received very good grades after an OFSTED inspection.

In 2008 the college celebrated the Queens Anniversary Award with a visit to Buckingham Palace to meet Queen Elizabeth and the Duke of Edinburgh.

On 16 October 2012 the Construction Centre, converted from the old sports hall, was officially opened by Tony Gray CEO of the Southwater Event Group.

In May 2013 the Discovery and Oakdene Centres opened.

In January 2014 the Orange Tree Restaurant, purchased by the college and converted from the Telford and Wrekin Council's Social Education Centre within the campus, opened for the teaching of catering courses and is open to the public once a week.

In September 2014 the Automotive Engineering centre opened. The official opening was performed on 7 November 2014 by British touring car champion Matt Neal.

On 17 October 2015 the college's Willow Tree Centre was officially opened by Councillor Paul Watling, cabinet member for children, young people and families in the Telford and Wrekin Council.

In September 2017 the college merged with New College, Telford forming Telford College unveiling the current logo beforehand. The college continued to use two existing campuses until September 2018, with New College keeping its separate identity until then, when all students were moved to the existing Haybridge Road campus with a further £2 million investment in a new facility.

Student numbers
It has over 16,000 students: 1200 full-time, 15,000 part-time. Students at present include school leavers, individuals taking a second chance at education, employees of multi-national companies and overseas students.

Course provision
The college offers a wide range of vocational courses including NVQs, professional, preparatory degree and tailor-made programmes. Since its merger with New College Telford, it has offered 22 A-level qualifications and became the second largest A-level provider in Shropshire after Shrewsbury Sixth Form College.

Gallery

References

External links
 Telford College website
 Telford College Superdome sports Website
 Telford College Activ8 young persons 14-16yrs Website
 Orange Tree at Telford College restaurant website

Education in Telford and Wrekin
Further education colleges in Shropshire
Learning and Skills Beacons
Wellington, Shropshire